Gábor (sometimes written Gabor) may refer to:

 Gábor (given name)
 Gabor (surname)
 Gabor sisters, the three famous actresses, Eva, Magda and Zsa Zsa
 Several scientific terms named after Dennis Gabor
 Gabor atom
 Gabor filter, a linear filter used in image processing
 Gabor transform
 Gabor Medal, a medal of Royal Society awarded to biologists